Kundal is a town in Palus Taluka within the Sangli District of southwestern Maharashtra, India. It has a population of 18,287 people - 9,432 males and 8,855 females according to the 2011 census.

History
Kundal was originally the region around Sangli, and was the capital of the Chalukyas. Kundal is a historical place; its ancient name was Koundinyapuro. The traditions of Kundal are more than 1,600 years old. It is believed that Samavsharan of Bhagwan Parsvanath, Mahaveer, and Shrutkevali Poojya Shridhara Muni came to the region and achieved salvation. In Kundal, Lord Parsvanath’s idol story is well-known.

It is said that after a son of a king died from disease, his newly married wife prepared an idol of Parsvanath made of sand. The Goddess Padmavati started praying and worshiping it with all her heart. Owing to the power of such sincere worship, her husband was resurrected. The story of King Satyeshwar and Queen Padmashri of Koundinyapur is based on similar concepts and ideas.

Kundal was home to freedom fighters such as Krantisigha Nana Patil, Krantiagrani G. D. (Bapu) Lad, Krantiveer Captain Akaram (Dada) Pawar, Krantiveer R. S. (Mama) Pawar, Captain Rambhau Lad, Khasherao (Aabaa) Pawar  , Yashwant (Baba) Pawar, Shankar Jangam and many others.
Kundal village is also associated with famous and popular Marathi poet and lyricist Gajanan Digambar Madgulkar, popularly known as GaDiMa. He resided here during his early days.
Marathi is the official language in Kundal. Kundal is famously known for 99-year-old Maharstra Kusti Maidan start 1922 and an annual Kusti competition.

Industry
The Kundal industrial area is the largest in the Sangli district. It includes companies like the Kranti Sugar Factory. 
Kundal is also known for production of grapes, such as the "Sonakka, Sharad, Super Sonakka, Thomsan and Export Quality (Europe)" grape and largest production of sugarcane.

Education 
Kundal Academy of Development, Administration and Management is Maharashtra's first forest training academy serving NGOs in the field of environmental protection. This is the fifth Forest Academy of India, catering to the training needs of State Services Forest Officers of Western India. Kundal is mainly two Educations Societies first one is Gandhi Education Society's which includes  Pratinidhi High School Kundal was established in 1949. Pratinidhi High School and Jr. College was established by the great eminent personalities like late Dr.G.D. Bapu Lad for the uplifment of common learner of common man.

Pratinidhi Highschool and Jr. College,  Kundal is located at Kundal, Palus in Sangli district of Maharashtra, India. It is affiliated with Maharashtra State Board of Secondary and Higher Secondary Education (MSBSHSE). Pratinidhi High School Kundal is a higher secondary. It is a private aided government school.

The only purpose behind establishment of this school is to provide better education to the people in rural areas. "Education should be able to provide us livelihood after learning. Also we must enrich quality of Education so it may result in benefit of masses", this is the purpose of our school.

Second Society is Dr. Patangrao Kadam Vidyalaya and Junior College, Kundal main reason is both societies are charge very cheap amount for education.

Economy 
The most of peoples of this village depends on Agro based production. It is famous for good quality of grapes production.

Agriculture
Kundal is famous for growing export quality grapes. Sugarcane is most growing crop and many farmers are famous to grow high quality sugarcane.

Transport
You can reach Kundal by the following ways:
 By Railway: The nearest railway station is Kirloskarwadi, which lies on the south-central railway line. The main line, just  from Kundal, is connected to Mumbai, Tirupati, Chennai, Bangalore, Pune, Goa, etc.

References

Cities and towns in Sangli district
Talukas in Maharashtra